Jonas Victolero Villanueva (born March 31, 1983) is a Filipino former professional basketball player and coach. Villanueva played 12 seasons in the Philippine Basketball Association (PBA). He also coached the Bataan Risers of the Maharlika Pilipinas Basketball League (MPBL). Born in Bulacan, Philippines, he played college basketball for the FEU Tamaraws in which he helped the University to claim its 19th UAAP Men's Basketball Championship in its 68th season alongside Mark Isip, R.J. Rizada, Jeffrei Chan and former San Miguel teammate Arwind Santos.

He was selected 9th overall during the 2007 PBA draft by the San Miguel Beermen. He struggled as he played a backup role under longtime veteran Olsen Racela. But then, he was promoted as the team's starting point guard when former no. 1 draft pick Mike Cortez fell into a season-ending injury and the team's long-time floor leader Olsen Racela's game starting to fade away.

In the 2008–09 PBA season, he was awarded the Most Improved Player award. He won the Fern-C Finals MVP honor after winning the 2009 PBA Fiesta Conference Championship with San Miguel.

In 2010, he was traded to Star Hotshots for Paul Artadi.

In 2013, he was traded alongside JC Intal to Barako Bull Energy Cola for Alex Mallari, Leo Najorda and Lester Alvarez.

PBA career statistics

Correct as of September 23, 2016

Season-by-season averages

|-
| align="left" | 
| align="left" | Magnolia
| 31 || 10.6 || .493 || .442 || .682 || 1.5 || 1.5 || .5 || .1 || 3.4
|-
| align="left" | 
| align="left" | San Miguel
| 54 || 23.2 || .413 || .321 || .694 || 3.3 || 4.0 || 1.1 || .2 || 8.5
|-
| align="left" | 
| align="left" | San Miguel
| 55 || 21.1 || .389 || .302 || .694 || 3.2 || 3.9 || .7 || .1 || 5.6
|-
| align="left" | 
| align="left" | B-Meg
| 33 || 25.8 || .361 || .269 || .735 || 3.2 || 3.3 || .9 || .1 || 9.0
|-
| align="left" | 
| align="left" | B-Meg
| 34 || 12.7 || .367 || .382 || .667 || 1.7 || 1.4 || .4 || .1 || 3.7
|-
| align="left" | 
| align="left" | B-Meg / San Mig Coffee / Barako Bull
| 29 || 23.5 || .322 || .246 || .652 || 2.5 || 3.1 || .7 || .1 || 5.6
|-
| align="left" | 
| align="left" | Barako Bull
| 31 || 19.5 || .338 || .282 || .588 || 2.2 ||	2.3 ||	.9 ||	.1 ||	4.5
|-
| align="left" | 
| align="left" | NLEX
| 36 || 31.1 || .380 || .288 || .765 || 3.6 ||	4.0 ||	1.3 ||	.1 ||	8.7
|-
| align="left" | 
| align="left" | NLEX
| 35 || 30.0 || .387 || .335 || .691 || 2.9 ||	3.0 ||	1.0 ||	.0 ||	9.9
|-class=sortbottom
| align="center" colspan=2 | Career
| 338 || 22.1 || .381 || .311 || .698 || 2.8 ||	3.1 ||	.8 ||	.1 ||	6.7

References

1983 births
Living people
Air21 Express players
Barako Bull Energy players
Basketball players from Bulacan
Filipino men's basketball coaches
Filipino men's basketball players
Magnolia Hotshots players
NLEX Road Warriors players
Point guards
San Miguel Beermen players
FEU Tamaraws basketball players
San Miguel Beermen draft picks